Conus arafurensis is a species of sea snail, a marine gastropod mollusk in the family Conidae, the cone snails, cone shells or cones.

These snails are predatory and venomous. They are capable of "stinging" humans.

Description
The size of the shell varies between 25 mm and 51 mm.

Distribution
This species occurs in the Arafura Sea.

References

 Monnier E., Limpalaër L. & Robin A. (2013) Revision of the Pionoconus achatinus complex. Description of three new species: P. koukae n. sp. from Oman, P. arafurensis n. sp. from northern Australia and P. rouxi n. sp. from Western Australia. Xenophora Taxonomy 1: 3-39.
 Puillandre N., Duda T.F., Meyer C., Olivera B.M. & Bouchet P. (2015). One, four or 100 genera? A new classification of the cone snails. Journal of Molluscan Studies. 81: 1-23

External links
 To World Register of Marine Species
 

arafurensis
Gastropods of Australia
Gastropods described in 2013